Heldt is a German surname, an alternative spelling of Held, meaning 'hero'. Notable people with the surname include :

Antonio Barbosa Heldt (died 1973), Mexican politician
Barbara Heldt (born 1940), American writer
Dora Heldt (born 1961), German writer
Horst Heldt (born 1969), German footballer
Werner Heldt (1904–1954), German painter

See also
Heldt Prize, a literary award

German-language surnames